Viktor Kolář (born 7 September 1941) is a Czech photographer. Kolář, along with Jindřich Štreit, is considered one of the most important exponents of Czech documentary photography. In his works, Kolář focuses mainly on depicting urban life in the Ostrava region.

Biography 

Kolář was born in 1941 in Ostrava. His father, a self-taught filmmaker and photographer, was the owner of a photo studio and photo shop, an important factor in leading young Viktor to photography.

In 1953, he began taking photographs, and soon familiarized himself with the works of renowned photographers, particularly Henri Cartier-Bresson. From 1960 to 1964, he studied at the Photographic Institute in Ostrava. After that, he taught at an elementary school. From the second half of the 1960s, he decided to devote himself fully to photography. At the same time, he met and befriended the photography theorist Anna Fárová and her husband, painter Libor Fára. In 1964, Kolář presented his works at his first solo exhibition. In October 1968, after the Warsaw Pact invasion of Czechoslovakia, he emigrated to Canada, where he worked as an assistant in the molybdenum mines and as a worker in the nickel smelters in Manitoba. Later he managed to move into photography. From 1971 to 1973, he participated in documenting shopping malls in Montreal, which resulted in an exhibition in the Optica Gallery, Montreal. In Canada and the US, Kolář met photographers Michael Semak, William Ewing and Cornell Capa. In 1973, however, he returned to Czechoslovakia through Paris and London. His return to the communist country was questioned by state authorities and Kolář was interrogated by police on several occasions. As a former emigrant (and therefore considered unreliable by the regime), he gradually lost the possibility to work as a photographer. At the time of deep "normalization", he worked as a laborer in Nová Huť Steelworks (formerly named after Klement Gottwald). However, he covertly continued his photographic documentation of the Ostrava region. From 1975 to 1984, he worked as a stage technician at the Petr Bezruč Theatre. In 1985, he was allowed to devote himself to freelance photography. In 1991, he received the prize of the Mother Jones Foundation in San Francisco. In 1994, after the Velvet Revolution, he began to teach documentary photography at FAMU in Prague, where he was appointed Associate Professor (in 2000). He also travelled and lectured through the USA.

Selected publications 
Daniela Mrázková. Viktor Kolář. Ostrava: Profil, 1986. . Text in Czech, with summaries in English, German and Russian.
Viktor Kolář. Baník Ostrava. West Berlin: Ex-Pose, 1986. . Text in Czech, German and English. 
Viktor Kolář. Malá Strana. Prague: Köcher & Köcher, 1993. . Text in Czech, German, English and French.
Viktor Kolář and Jaroslav Žila. Ostrava-obležené město. Ostrava: SFINGA, 1995. .
Viktor Kolář. Seminar in Documentary Photography. Prague: Academy of Performing Arts, 2000. .
Jiří Cieslar. Viktor Kolář. PhotoTorst 9. Prague: Torst, 2002. .
Viktor Kolář, et al. Ostrava. Prague: Kant, 2010. . Text in Czech and English.
Viktor Kolář, et al. Canada, 1968–1973. Prague: Kant, 2013. . Text in Czech and English.
Viktor Kolář and Roland Angst. Viktor Kolář: Human. Berlin: Only Photography, 2015. . Text in German and English. Edition of 300 copies.

Collections
Kolář's work is held in the following collections:
Art Institute of Chicago (Chicago)
International Centre of Photography (New York City)
Maison Européenne de la Photographie (Paris)
Musée de l´Photographie (Lausanne)
Moravian Gallery (Brno)
Museum of Decorative Arts (Prague)
Museum Ludwig, (Cologne)
Museum of Fine Arts, Houston
Victoria and Albert Museum (London)

Solo exhibitions 
1964 – Fotografie Viktora Koláře. Černá louka, Ostrava.
1973 – Viktor Kolar's Czech Eye. Optica Gallery, Montreal.
1976 – Člověk mezi lidmi. Fotochema, Ostrava.
1978 – Ostrava. Fotochema, Ostrava.
1981 – Ostrava – fotografie 1968–1980. Dům umění města Brna, Brno.
1981 – Novosvětská setkání. Galerie pod Podloubím, Olomouc.
1981 – Ostrava. Malá výstavní síň, Liberec.
1981 – Novosvětská setkání. Galéria F, Banská Bystrica.
1981 – Ostrava. Ústav makromolekulární chemie ČSAV, Prague.
1981 – Novosvětská setkání. Fotochema, Ostrava.
1981 – Ostrava. Canon Gallery, Amsterdam.
1981 – Viktor Kolář. Fotografijos Galeria, Kaunas.
1981 – Viktor Kolář – fotografie. Muzeum Stillonu, Gorzów.
1987 – Viktor Kolář – fotografie. Realistické divadlo, Prague.
1988 – 13 let. Galerie 4, Cheb.
1991 – Viktor Kolář. Pražský dům fotografie, Prague.
1991 – Viktor Kolář. Robert Koch Gallery, San Francisco.
1991 – Viktor Kolář – Schwarzes Ostrava. Palais Jalta, Frankfurt am Main.
1992 – Baník Ostrava. Museum Hoesch, Dortmund.
1993 – Nevinné oko. Městské muzeum, Ostrava.
1993 – Baník Ostrava. Rheinisches Industriemuseum, Engelskirchen.
1994 – Viktor Kolář. Slovenský rozhlas, Bratislava.
1995 – Viktor Kolář – 40 fotografií. Americké kulturní a obchodní centrum, Prague.
1996 – Kolářovy ostravské fotografie. Dům umění města Brna, Brno.
1996 – Viktor Kolář. Slezské muzeum, Opava.
1996 – Viktor Kolář. Toldkammeret, Elsinor.
1996 – Viktor Kolář – fotografie. Biennale of International Photography, Skopelos.
1997 – Viktor Kolář – Ostrava. The Photographic Center, Athens.
1997 – Viktor Kolář (1967–77). Galerie Václava Špály, Prague.
1998 – Viktor Kolář – fotografie. Musée de l'Élysée, Lausanne.
1999 – Viktor Kolář. České centrum, Berlin.
1999 – Viktor Kolář. Ostrava 1963–1999. Galerie výtvarného umění v Ostravě, Ostrava.
2002 – Viktor Kolář Photographs – Czech Photography II. Leica Gallery, New York City.
2002 – Malá Strana (Prague) photographs of Viktor Kolář. Blue Sky Gallery, Portland, Oregon.
2003 – Naostro (50 fotografií Viktora Koláře 1989–2003). Muzeum Boskovicka, Boskovice.
2007 – Viktor Kolar Photographs. Museum – The World of Glass, St. Helens, UK.
2008 – Město budoucnosti. Galerie u Rytíře, Liberec.
2009 – Retrospektywa/Retrospective of VK. Gallery A. Starmach, Kraków.
2013 – Retrospective Viktor Kolář. Prague City Gallery, Prague
2015 – Viktor Kolář. Photographs. Sprengel Museum, Hannover

Notes

References 

Living people
Czech photographers
People from Ostrava
1941 births